In Mexico, the term mestizo (lit. "mixed") is used to refer to an identity of those of mixed European (mainly Spanish) and indigenous Mexican descent. Some believe it can be defined by criteria ranging from ideological and cultural to self-identification or physical appearance. According to these criteria, estimates of the number of mestizos in Mexico vary from about 40 percent of the population to nearly all (including White Mexicans) who do not belong to the country's indigenous minorities.

The meaning of the word mestizo has changed with time; it was originally used in the colonial era to refer to individuals who had one Spanish and one Amerindian parent. Although the caste system and racial classification were officially abandoned when Mexico became independent, the label mestizo was still used in academic circles to refer to people of mixed race. A mestizo ideology was created (exemplified by the José Vasconcelos essay La raza cósmica) that mestizos are the result of racial mixing, and all Mexico must become mestizo so the country could achieve prosperity. After the Mexican Revolution, the government adopted and promoted the mestizo ideology to create a unified Mexican identity with no racial distinctions. By 1930, racial identities other than "indigenous" disappeared from the Mexican census. All Mexicans who did not speak indigenous languages (including European Mexicans) were now considered mestizo, transforming a racial identity into a national one.

People of different phenotypes make up Mexico's mestizo population, whether or not they have mixed-race ancestry. Since the term has a number of socio-cultural, economic, racial and genetic meanings, estimates of the Mexican mestizo population vary widely. According to the Encyclopædia Britannica, which bases its estimate on the 1921 census, from one-half to two-thirds of the Mexican population is mestizo. As Mexico's national identity, all Mexicans who are not indigenous and participate in the nation's culture may be considered mestizo (culturally Mexican) regardless of racial background. The word had disappeared from the popular Mexican vocabulary long ago, since it had a pejorative connotation. Modern academics have challenged the mestizo concept on the grounds that census data indicates that marriages between people of different races were rare; the ideology has incentivized racism rather than ending it, denying Mexico's distinct ethnic groups and cultures.

History 

When the term mestizo and the caste system were introduced to Mexico is unknown, but the earliest surviving records categorizing people by "qualities" (as castes were known in early colonial Mexico) are late-18th-century church birth and marriage records. An extensive caste system assigned a name to each possible racial combination; unlike later definitions of mestizo, in these records it referred only to people with half-Spanish and half-indigenous ancestry. The system is present in New Spain's first national census (in 1793), in which castizo, pardo, mulatto and zambo are also collectively listed as "castes". The caste system and racial censuses were legally abandoned after independence, and academics who reviewed and republished the census figures referred to the castes simply as mestizos.

A number of historians have questioned the existence of a caste system, considering it a fabrication by historians which began during the 1940s. Pilar Gonzalbo, in her study "The Trap of the Caste", discards the idea of a caste-based society in New Spain understood as a "social organization based on the race and supported by coercive power".

Recent scholarship questions the existence of a caste system and reviewing the use of terms in colonial sources. According to a journal article, "In the twentieth century, the prestige of authors such as Angel Rosenblat and Gonzalo Aguirre Beltrán, who unreservedly admitted the concept of society of caste, has determined the perpetuation of a myth of social stratification based on race".

The new definition of mestizo was used in the 1921 census (the second nationwide census which included a comprehensive racial classification). The census was conducted after the Mexican Revolution, when the government was rebuilding the country and hoped to unite all Mexicans in a single national identity. The government found the identity in the mestizo ideology forged by the academics and politicians José Vasconcelos and Manuel Gamio, which asserted that Mexican mestizos resulted from mixing all the races; with the best qualities of each race, Mexico would achieve prosperity when the country's entire population became mestizo. By the 1930 census the racial classifications of "White" and "Mestizo" had disappeared, and all Mexicans who did not speak an indigenous language were implicitly considered mestizo. The government also implemented cultural policies designed to "help" indigenous peoples achieve the same level of progress as mestizo society, eventually assimilating them into mainstream Mexican culture to solve the "Indian problem" by transforming indigenous communities into mestizo ones.

Although the concept of mestizo has been generally praised in Mexican intellectual circles, it has recently been criticized; according to detractors, it delegitimizes the importance of race in Mexico by saying that "(racism) [does] not exist here (in Mexico), as everybody is Mestizo." A study concludes that Mexico introducing racial classification and accepting itself as a multicultural country (rather than a monolithic mestizo country) would benefit Mexican society as a whole. Other critics say that the ideology could not homogenize Mexico's races because it sought to "whiten" indigenous peoples rather than "Indianize" whites and accidentally erased minority ethnic groups (such as Afro-Mexicans) from history. 

Outside Mexico, the word mestizo is still used to refer to people with mixed indigenous and European ancestry. This does not conform to present-day Mexican usage, where a person of indigenous genetic heritage would be considered mestizo by rejecting his indigenous culture or not speaking an indigenous language and a person with little (or no) indigenous genetic heritage would be considered indigenous by speaking an indigenous language or identifying with an indigenous cultural heritage. In some regions, such as the Yucatán Peninsula, mestizo refers to Maya-speaking populations in traditional communities for historical reasons. In Chiapas, Ladino is used instead of mestizo.

Mestizo is not widely used in contemporary Mexican society; its use is limited to social and cultural studies when referring to the non-indigenous Mexican population. It has a pejorative connotation; most Mexicans who would be defined as mstizos in sociological literature would probably self-identify as Mexicans, complicating their quantification via self-identification. This contrasts with ethno-racial terms such as "Indian", "White" and "Black", still common in everyday Mexican social interactions.

Genetic studies

Population genetics
Mexicans who are biologically mestizo are primarily of European and Native American ancestry.

At the end of the colonial period, about 10 percent of the population (Euromestizos and Indomestizos were estimated at 1,000,000 and 600,000, respectively).

The mestizo ideology, which has blurred racial lines at the institutional level, has significantly influenced Mexican genetic studies. Since the criteria used in studies to determine if a Mexican is mestizo or indigenous are often cultural traits (such as language spoken) instead of racial self-identification or a phenotype-based selection, studies of populations considered indigenous because of the language spoken (like the Nahuas from Veracruz) indicate a higher degree of European genetic admixture than populations considered mestizo in other studies. Populations considered mestizo are also genetically similar to continental European peoples (like those in Durango) or European Americans (like those in Jalisco).

Autosomal studies

Genetic research on the Mexican population is abundant, and has yielded a variety of results. Genetic studies in the same location vary. In Monterrey, Nuevo León, studies indicate an average European ancestry ranging from 38 to 78 percent; in Mexico City, European admixture ranges from 21 to 70 percent. Reasons for the variation may include the socioeconomic background of the analyzed samples and the criteria for recruiting volunteers. Some studies only analyze Mexicans who self-identify as mestizo, and others classify the entire Mexican population as mestizo. Other studies may do both, such as the 2009 genetic study published by the Instituto Nacional de Medicina Genómica (INMEGEN) which reported that 93 percent of the Mexican population is mestizo; the remainder were Amerindian. However, the INMEGEN study only recruited people who self-identified as mestizo. Some studies avoid racial classification, including anyone who self-identifies as Mexican; these studies usually report the highest European admixture in a given location.

Regardless of criteria, the autosomal DNA studies agree that there is significant genetic variation depending on the region analyzed. Southern Mexico has prevalent Amerindian and small (but higher than average) African genetic contributions; central Mexico has a balance of Amerindian and European components, the latter gradually increasing in the north and west (where European ancestry is most of the genetic contribution. In cities on the Mexico–United States border, studies suggest a significant resurgence of Amerindian and African admixture. A 2006 INMEGEN study which genotyped 104 samples reported that mestizo Mexicans are 59 percent European, 35 percent "Asian" (primarily Amerindian), and five percent other.

INMEGEN research has found that Mexico's mestizo population is not uniform in its genetic composition, with significant regional variation. Light-skinned mestizos predominate in Sonora, and mestizos from the central region (Guanajuato and Zacatecas) are split between indigenous and European composition. The highest African contribution in the twelve participating states (representative of the country's major regions) was found in Guerrero and Veracruz, and the highest Asian contribution was found in Guerrero and Sonora.

A University College London study which included Mexico, Brazil, Chile and Colombia, conducted with each country's anthropology and genetics institutes, reported that the genetic ancestry of Mexican mestizos was 56 percent Native American, 37 percent European and five percent African, making Mexico (after Peru and Bolivia) the country with the highest Amerindian ancestry of the five sample populations. Phenotypical traits were analyzed; the frequency of blond hair and light eyes in Mexicans was  18.5 and 28.5 percent, respectively, giving Mexico the study's second-highest frequency of blond hair. The reason for the discrepancy between phenotypical traits and genetic ancestry may lie in the low African contribution in the Mexican population compared with that of Brazil and Colombia. The Mexican samples were disproportionate; northern and western Mexico have 45 percent of its population, but no more than 10 percent of the study's samples came from states located in those regions. For the most part, the rest of the samples were from Mexico City and southern Mexican states.

Additional studies correlate a tendency toward higher European admixture with higher socioeconomic status, and higher Amerindian ancestry  with lower socioeconomic status. A study of low-income mestizos in Mexico City found the mean admixture 0.590, 0.348 and 0.062 for Amerindian, European and African, respectively, and European admixture was found to be about 70 percent on average for mestizos in one report in which they're suggested to be at a higher socioeconomic level. A 2011 autosomal DNA study conducted in Mexico City with 1,310 samples indicated that the average proportion of Native American, European, and African ancestry for the population was 64, 32 and four percent, respectively. Additional autosomal DNA studies conducted on people from Mexico City show a predominantly Native American background, with Native American ancestry ranging from 61 to 69 percent in five studies. The number of people sampled in the studies ranged from 66 to 984. An outlier study indicated a predominantly-European background for Mexico City mestizos: 57 percent European ancestry, 40 percent Native American ancestry, and three percent African ancestry. However, the study sampled only 19 people.

MtDna and Y DNA studies
A 2012 study published by the Journal of Human Genetics of Y chromosomes  found the paternal ancestry of the Mexican mestizo population predominately European (64.9 percent), followed by Amerindian (30.8 percent) and Asian (1.2 percent).
The European Y chromosome was more prevalent in the north and west (66.7 to 95 percent), and Native American ancestry increased in the center and southeast (37 to 50 percent); African ancestry was low and relatively homogeneous (zero to 8.8 percent). States participating in the study where Aguascalientes, Chiapas, Chihuahua, Durango, Guerrero, Jalisco, Oaxaca, Sinaloa, Veracruz and Yucatán. The greatest number of chromosomes found were identified as belonging to haplogroups from Western Europe, East Europe and Eurasia, Siberia and the Americas and Northern Europe, with traces of haplogroups from Central Asia, Southeast Asia, South Asia, Western Asia, the Caucasus, North Africa, the Near East, East Asia, Northeast Asia, Southwest Asia and the Middle East. A study published in 2011 of Mexican mitochondrial DNA found that maternal ancestry was predominately Native American (85–90 percent), with a minority having European (five to seven percent) or African (three to five percent) mtDNA.

A Mexico City autosomal ancestry study found that the European ancestry of Mexicans was 52 percent; the remainder was primarily Amerindian, with a small African contribution. Maternal ancestry was also analyzed, with 47 percent of European origin. The only criterion for sample selection was that the volunteers self-identified as Mexican.

Culture 
New Spain developed a culture distinct from indigenous and Spanish culture, with African and Asian influences. After independence, the Mexican population was estimated at 50–60 percent indigenous, 18 to 22 percent Creole and about one percent Black; the rest of the population (21 to 25 percent) was considered mestizo, an important part of the independence movement.

Music 

The  is a musical ensemble primarily consisting of wind instruments, brass, and percussion. The history of Mexican mestizo music dates back to the mid-nineteenth century arrival of piston brass instruments, when communities tried to imitate military bands.

Cuisine 
Mestizo cuisine combines produce such as corn, chili peppers, tomatoes, potatoes and fruits and brushes from the Americas with meat from turkeys, quail and fish. Europe introduced other meats (beef, pork, chicken, goat, and sheep), dairy products (especially cheese and milk), and rice. Sephardic Jewish cuisine, Asian and African influences also affected the indigenous cuisine.

Mexican cuisine is an important aspect of the culture, social structure, and popular traditions of mestizo Mexico. An example of this blended cuisine is the use of mole for special occasions and holidays throughout the country. Traditional Mexican cuisine was added to UNESCO's Representative List of the Intangible Cultural Heritage of Humanity in 2010.

Notable Mexican mestizos



See also 
 Martín Cortés (son of Malinche)
 Bronze (racial classification)
 Coloureds
 Pardo
 Indigenous peoples of Mexico
 Racism in Mexico
 Spaniards in Mexico
 Afro-Mexicans
 Asian Mexicans
 Demographics of Mexico

References and footnotes

External links 
 Instituto Nacional de Medicina Genómica

Mestizo
Ethnic groups in Mexico

.
Afro-Mexican
Asian Mexican
 
 
Mexican people of Asian descent